Mireuk station is a closed station on Gyeongbu Line.

Defunct railway stations in South Korea